Konstantin Chaschukhin (born June 5, 1978) is a Russian professional ice hockey goaltender who currently plays for HC Yugra of the Kontinental Hockey League (KHL).

Chaschukhin was born in Perm, Russia.

References

External links

Living people
HC Yugra players
Zauralie Kurgan players
Russian ice hockey goaltenders
1978 births
Sportspeople from Perm, Russia